John Badlam Howe Mansion is a historic home located on the grounds of Howe Military School, in Howe, Lima Township, LaGrange County, Indiana.  It was built in 1875–1876, and is a two-story, Italianate style white brick building trimmed with stone and terra cotta.  It measures 51 feet by 78 feet, and features a three-story, central tower with a Second Empire style mansard roof.

It was listed in the National Register of Historic Places in 1995.

References

Houses on the National Register of Historic Places in Indiana
Italianate architecture in Indiana
Second Empire architecture in Indiana
Houses completed in 1876
Buildings and structures in LaGrange County, Indiana
National Register of Historic Places in LaGrange County, Indiana